Antonio Sant'Elia (30 April 1888 – 10 October 1916) was an Italian architect and a key member of the Futurist movement in architecture. He left behind almost no completed works of architecture and is primarily remembered for his bold sketches and influence on modern architecture.

Life
Antonio Sant'Elia was born in Como, Lombardy. A builder by training, he opened a design office in Milan in 1912 and became involved with the Futurist movement. A nationalist as well as an irredentist, Sant'Elia joined the Italian army as Italy entered World War I in 1915. He was killed during the Eighth Battle of the Isonzo, near Gorizia.

Writing
The Manifesto of Futurist Architecture was published in August 1914, supposedly by Sant'Elia, though this is subject to debate. In it, the author stated that "the decorative value of Futurist architecture depends solely on the use and original arrangement of raw or bare or violently colored materials".  His vision was for a highly industrialized and mechanized city of the future, which he saw not as a mass of individual buildings but a vast, multi-level, interconnected and integrated urban conurbation designed around the "life" of the city.

Designs
Between 1912 and 1914, influenced by industrial cities of the United States and the architects  Otto Wagner, Adolf Loos, and the Genoese architect Renzo Picasso, he began a series of design drawings for a futurist Città Nuova ("New City") that was conceived as a symbol of a new age. Many of these drawings were displayed at the only exhibition of the Nuove Tendenze group (of which he was a member) exhibition in May/June 1914 at the "Famiglia Artistica" gallery.

Influence
His extremely influential designs featured vast monolithic skyscraper buildings with terraces, bridges and aerial walkways that embodied the sheer excitement of modern architecture and technology. Even in this excitement for technology and modernity, in Sant'Elia's monumentalism, however, can be found elements of  Art Nouveau architect Giuseppe Sommaruga.

Though most of his designs were never built, his futurist vision has influenced many. Among architects he is cited as a forerunner to John Portman and Helmut Jahn. Films such as Fritz Lang's 1927 Metropolis and Ridley Scott's 1982 Hollywood movie Blade Runner also show Sant'Elia's influence.

Works
La Città Nuova, 1914

Image gallery

See also
Futurist architecture

References

Bibliography 
 VV.AA. Angiolo Mazzoni e l'Architettura Futurista, Supplement of CE.S.A.R. September/December 2008 (Available at ) (Also at )
Riccardo Rosati, ‘Antonio Sant’Elia e il contributo del futurismo italiano in Metropolis e Akira’, Manga Academica, 13, 9-34, 2020.

External links

Website in Italian
Manifesto of Futurist Architecture

1888 births
1916 deaths
Italian Futurism
Futurist architects
20th-century Italian architects
Modernist architects from Italy
People from Como
Italian military personnel killed in World War I